The 1984 Anchorage mayoral election was held on October 2, 1984, to elect the mayor of Anchorage, Alaska. It saw reelection of Tony Knowles.

Since at least one candidate (in this instance, two candidates) had received 40% of the vote (which at least one candidate was required to obtain to avoid a runoff), no runoff was needed.

Results

References

See also

Anchorage
Anchorage 
1984